Windows 11 is a series of operating systems developed by Microsoft that was first released in October 2021. Microsoft described Windows as an "operating system as a service" that would receive ongoing updates to its features and functionality, augmented with the ability for enterprise environments to receive non-critical updates at a slower pace or use long-term support milestones that will only receive critical updates, such as security patches, over their five-year lifespan of mainstream support.

Channels

Windows Insider Preview builds are delivered to Insiders in four different channels. Insiders in the Dev and Canary Channel receive updates prior to those in the Beta Channel, but might experience more bugs and other issues. Insiders in the Release Preview Channel do not receive updates until the version is almost available to the public, but are comparatively more stable.

Version history
As with Windows 10 (since version 20H2), mainstream builds of Windows 11 are labeled "YYHX", with YY representing the two-digit year and X representing the half-year of planned release (for example, version 21H2 refers to builds which initially released in the second half of 2021).

Version 21H2 (original release)
The original version of Windows 11 (also known as version 21H2 and codenamed "Sun Valley") was released in October 2021. It carries the build number 10.0.22000. The first public preview build was made available to Windows Insiders who opted in to the Dev Channel on June 28, 2021.

Version 22H2 (2022 Update)
The Windows 11 2022 Update (also known as version 22H2 and codenamed "Sun Valley 2") is the first and current major update to Windows 11. It carries the build number 10.0.22621. The first preview was released to Insiders who opted in to the Dev Channel on September 2, 2021. The update began rolling out on September 20, 2022. Notable changes in the 2022 Update include:

 Redesigned and new Efficiency mode feature in Task Manager
 Re-added the drag and drop feature on the taskbar
 Improvement to the snap layout experience
 New live captions feature
 New Smart App Control (SAC) feature for blocking untrusted applications
 Split "Focus assist" feature into "Do not disturb" and "Focus"
 Included Clipchamp as inbox app

The first component update to Windows 11, version 22H2, codenamed "Moment 1", was released on October 18, 2022 with build 22621.675 and several further changes:
 New tabbed browsing feature and refreshed layout of the left navigation pane in the File Explorer
 New inline suggested actions feature
 Re-introduced taskbar overflow feature
 Improvements to the built-in Windows share window

The second component update to Windows 11, version 22H2, codenamed "Moment 2," was released on February 28, 2023 with build 22621.1344 and several further changes:
 Added iOS support in the Phone Link app
 New Studio Effects section in the Quick Settings for NPU-compatible devices
 Redesigned Quick Assist app
 Added third-party apps support in the Widgets panel
 Re-introduced tablet-optimized taskbar
 Added support for tabs in the Notepad app
 New Braille displays and input/output languages support in Narrator
 New Energy Recommendations page in the Settings app
 Updated touch keyboard option in the Settings app
 New Tamil Anjal keyboard
 Re-introduced the search box on the taskbar

As of build 22567, the version string has been changed from "Dev" to "22H2".

Dev Channel
On September 2, 2021, Microsoft announced that Windows Insiders in the Dev Channel will receive builds directly from the rs_prerelease branch, which are not matched to a specific Windows 11 release. The first build released under this strategy, build 22449, was made available to Insiders on the same day.

On February 3, 2022, Microsoft changed its plans on how they delivered builds for Windows Insiders, with Dev and Beta Channels are "parallel" active development branches, giving an option to switch from Dev to Beta Channel for a limited time. The Dev Channel builds are meant for upcoming and experimental features that may never release to general availability, whereas the Beta Channel builds are the "feature complete" builds that will make its way to the general availability for the specific Windows 11 release.

The ni_release branch was available from February 16 to May 11, 2022. Afterward, Insiders in the Dev Channel has been moved back to the rs_prerelease branch.

Canary Channel
On March 6, 2023, Microsoft announced that Windows Insiders who were previously in the Dev Channel on 25000 series builds would be moved to the Canary Channel. The first build released under this channel, build 25314, was made available to Insiders two days later. The Dev Channel was also rebooted to receive builds starting from build 23403.

See also
 Windows 10 version history
 Xbox OS version history

References

External links
 Windows release health
 Flight Hub

Windows 11
History of Microsoft
Software version histories
Tablet operating systems